William Senior (29 March 1838 – 7 October 1920) was an Anglo-Australian journalist, angler, Chief Hansard Short Hand Writer, co-founder of Brisbane's famed Johnsonian Club, editor and writer of short stories, known also by his pen name 'Red Spinner'.

Biography

Senior was born in Sherborne, Dorset, England in 1838, son of Joseph Senior and wife Martha.

Senior became the first officially appointed Principal Short Hand writer for the Parliament of Queensland's 'Hansard' (record of proceedings). He had by then served ten years as a special correspondent and parliamentary reporter for the London Daily News and London special reporter for the Manchester Examiner when he was employed (on the instigation of Queensland's Colonial Secretary and Premier, Arthur Macalister and the Speaker, William Henry Walsh), as Queensland Parliament's first Short Hand Writer on 13 January 1876. He was an able writer who produced in his spare time a number of short stories for the Queenslander during his time in office, simultaneously being a Queensland correspondent for his old journal the London Daily News.

Senior returned to England in April 1881 where he took up his old profession as a journalist on the Daily News and editor. He became editor-in-chief of the sports journal 'The Field,' of which journal he was formerly the angling editor. He wrote and edited this journal for over twenty-five years, still frequently using his old pen name "Red Spinner", simultaneously being for a number of years the London correspondent for the Brisbane Courier.

He died in London on the 7th October 1920 and was buried on the eastern side of Highgate Cemetery.

Books
 Notable Shipwrecks, 1873
  Waterside sketches. A book for wanderers and anglers, London 1875.
 By stream and sea. A book for wanderers and anglers, London 1877.
 Anderton's Angling, a novelette, 1878
 Travel and Trout in the Antipodes, 1880
 Scotch loch-fishing by 'Black Palmer'[pseud.], Edinburgh 1882.
 Angling in Great Britain, London 1883.
 Sea fishing by 'John Bickerdyke' [pseud.] with contributions on 'Antipodean and foreign fish' by W. Senior, 'Tarpon' by A.C. Harmsworth, 'Whaling' by Sir H.W. Gore-Booth, London 1895.
 Pike and perch (with chapters by 'John Bickerdyke' [pseud.] and W. H. Pope, Cookery by Alexander Innes Shand; illustrated by George Roller and from photographs). London 1900
 Lines in Pleasant Places: Being the Aftermath of an Old Angler'', London 1920.

References

External links
 Australasian & Pacific Hansard Editors Association
 
 

1838 births
1920 deaths
Burials at Highgate Cemetery
Australian writers
Australian editors
English writers
English editors